Italy competed at the 1971 European Athletics Indoor Championships in Sofia, Bulgaria, from 13 to 14 March 1971.

Medalists

Top eight
Five Italian athletes reached the top eight in this edition of the championships.
Men

Women

See also
 Italy national athletics team

References

External links
 EAA official site 

1971
1971 European Athletics Indoor Championships
1971 in Italian sport